The Wales national football team has represented Wales in international association football since 1876, making it the third oldest international football team. They played their first official match on 25 March 1876, four years after England and Scotland played the first ever international football match. They are governed by the Football Association of Wales and compete as a member of the Union of European Football Associations (UEFA), which predominantly encompasses the countries of Europe. , Wales have played 697 international matches since their debut, winning 221, drawing 153 and losing 323. They have played over 100 fixtures against England and Scotland, regularly competing against both in the British Home Championship between 1884 and 1984, winning the competition on twelve occasions. In global and continental competitions, Wales have qualified for two FIFA World Cups in 1958 and 2022, reaching the quarter-finals in the former, and two UEFA European Championships in 2016 and 2020 in their history, reaching the semi-finals in the former.

Wales were the last side from the Home Nations without a player reaching 100 caps. Gareth Bale is Wales most capped player with 111 caps. Chris Gunter became the first player to earn 100 Wales caps, reaching the tally on 27 March 2021 in a friendly against Mexico. Players who reach 50 appearances for Wales are awarded a golden cap. Bale also holds the record for the most goals scored for Wales having scored 41 goals, overtaking Ian Rush's record in March 2018.

Billy Meredith was the first Welsh player to reach 25 caps and went on to accumulate 48 caps in his career and score eleven goals, both Welsh records at the time. His appearance record stood for 42 years until it was beaten by Ivor Allchurch in 1962, who finished his career with 68 caps. Defender Joey Jones set a new record in the 1980s, amassing 72 caps, before his record was overtaken by Peter Nicholas in 1991 by a single cap. On 23 May 1994, Neville Southall played in a 2–1 victory over Estonia to earn his 74th cap and overtake Nicholas, eventually gaining 92 caps before retiring. Gunter surpassed Southall's cap record on 20 November 2018 against Albania, before he himself was overtaken when Bale made his 110th Wales appearance in their 2022 FIFA World Cup Group B match against Iran on 25 November 2022. As of November 2022, 105 players have gained 25 caps or more for Wales.

List of players
Appearances and goals are composed of FIFA World Cup and UEFA European Football Championship and each competition's required qualification matches, as well as numerous international friendly tournaments and matches. Players are listed by number of caps. If number of caps are equal, the players are then listed alphabetically. Statistics correct as of 29 November 2022.

Caps and goals sourced from:

Notes

References

Caps
Association football player non-biographical articles